The Nokia 6010 is an entry-level mobile phone with a Nokia Series 40 96 × 65 color user interface.

Released in 2004, it operates on North American GSM-1900 and GSM-850 networks. GPRS is used for data transmission and mobile Internet WAP 2.0 service. Users can download Java applications, background images, and polyphonic ringtones. The phone is an update of the Nokia 3595, with a more conservative design to appeal to business users, rather than the youth-oriented design of the 3595.  The 6010 also includes updated firmware, with many software bugs from the 3595 fixed. The phone supports SMS and MMS messaging and includes an IM client for AOL Instant Messenger and ICQ in the latest firmware revisions. Basic functions include a calendar, 30 entry To-do list, an alarm clock, a stopwatch, a calculator, and a voice command system. The 6010 is of the DCT4 hardware generation. The faceplate can be customized with an Xpress-on changeable cover. The phone does not have a camera and is somewhat larger than other phones of the time.

Reception 
Nokia 6010 is said to be a solid, reliable and durable mobile phone. As with many Nokia handsets, tests have shown that the phone is able to resist rugged use and extreme environmental conditions.

Technical Information

References

6010